Squeaker may refer to:

 Arthroleptidae, a frog family
 Squeaker (fish), Synodontis, a catfish genus
 The Squeaker (disambiguation), multiple uses
 Squeaker, the noisemaker in a squeaky toy
 Squeaker, another name for a party horn

Animal common name disambiguation pages